Xanthium orientale is a species of annual plant of the daisy family Asteraceae.

Use by Native Americans
The Zuni people use the plant for multiple purposes. The chewed seeds are rubbed onto the body before the cactus ceremony to protect it from spines. A compound poultice of seeds is applied to wounds or used to remove splinters. The seeds are also ground, mixed with cornmeal, made into cakes, and steamed for food.

References

orientale
Flora of North America
Flora of Europe
Flora of temperate Asia
Taxa named by Carl Linnaeus